William Neill (22 February 1922 – 5 April 2010) was an Ayrshire-born poet who wrote in Scottish and Irish Gaelic, Scots and English. He was a major contributing voice to the Scottish Renaissance.

Early life
Neill was born in Prestwick, Ayrshire and educated at Ayr Academy. After service in the RAF, he studied at the University of Edinburgh and graduated with an Honours degree in Celtic studies. He was a frequent contributor to Catalyst and Gairm magazines and subsequently became the second editor of Catalyst. As a young writer, he studied the poets of the Scottish Renaissance, and viewed 'modern assertions that "Scots was dying in the time of Burns" as the assertions of dyed-in-the-wool townies.

Career
Neill lived in Crossmichael in Kirkcudbrightshire, Galloway and taught English at Castle Douglas High School; his wife taught at the primary school. Occasionally he would sicken of teaching English and conduct lessons in Scots instead.

Awards
The Gaelic poetry of William Neill took the National Mòd's bardic crown at Aviemore in 1969. Other awards for his poetry have included The Grierson Verse Prize (1970), Sloan Prize (1970) and a Scottish Arts Council Book Award (1985).

Works
Scotland's Castle, Reprographia (Gordon Wright), 1969
Four Points of a Saltire, Reprographia (Gordon Wright), 1970
Then and Now: poems and songs, W. Neill
Poems, Akros Publications, 1970
Despatches Home, Reprographia (Gordon Wright), 1972, 
Wild Places: Poems in Three Leids, Luath Press, 1985
Making Tracks: and other poems, Gordon Wright Publishing, 1988, 
Straight Lines, Blackstaff Press, 1992, 
Tales frae the Odyssey o Homer, Saltire Society, 1992, 
Selected Poems, 1969-1992, Canongate Press, 1994, 
A Hantle o Romanesco Sonnets bi Giuseppe Gioachino Belli (1791-1863), Burnside Press, 1995, 
Galloway Landscapes: poems, URR Publications, 1981, ; Previous Parrot Press, 1997
Caledonian Cramboclink, Luath Press, 2000,

Later life
He died in Munches Park Residential Home in Dalbeattie on 5 April 2010.

See also

Scotsoun

References

External links

John Hudson interviews William Neill booksfromscotland, May 22, 2008

1922 births
2010 deaths
Scots Makars
Scottish Renaissance
20th-century Scottish Gaelic poets
21st-century Scottish Gaelic poets
20th-century Irish-language poets
Irish language outside Ireland
Lallans poets
20th-century Scottish poets
Scottish male poets
Alumni of the University of Edinburgh
People educated at Ayr Academy
20th-century British male writers